For the Winter Olympics, there have been six venues that have been or will be used for skeleton. When the Winter Olympics were in St. Moritz, they took place at the Cresta Run for both 1928 and 1948. Since being re-introduced at the 2002 Winter Olympics, skeleton has shared the same venue with the other sliding sports of bobsleigh and luge.

References

Venues
 
Skeleton